Leptuca terpsichores, commonly known as the dancing fiddler crab, is a species of fiddler crab native to the eastern Pacific coast of the Americas, from Nicaragua to Peru.

Taxonomy

Previously a member of the genus Uca, the species was transferred in 2016 to the genus Leptuca when Leptuca was promoted from subgenus to genus level. At one time, the species was considered a subspecies of L. musica.

Description
The adult carapace is approximately 7mm wide. The carapace is grey in color and males may exhibit yellow dorsal markings.

Similar species
Leptuca terpsichores is smaller than L. musica. L. terpsichores has smaller tubercles on the outer manus and fewer tubercles along the anterior carapace. The gape in the major cheliped is less serrate and the gape in the minor cheliped is slightly narrower.

Habitat
The species can be found on bay shores with muddy sand substrate.

References

Ocypodoidea
Taxa named by Jocelyn Crane
Crustaceans described in 1941